Jugla may refer to:

 Jugla, Riga, a neighbourhood of Riga, Latvia
 Jugla Lake, a lake in Latvia
 Jugla (river), a river in Latvia
 Mazā Jugla, a river in Latvia
 Lielā Jugla, a river in Latvia